The Doctor of Literature and Philosophy, or DLitt et Phil, is a doctoral advanced research degree offered by a number of leading universities in South Africa, such as UJ, the University of Johannesburg; and UNISA, the University of South Africa.  The degree is equivalent to a PhD and is generally offered in arts, human science (humanities), and social science subjects.

Requirements
At universities such as the University of Johannesburg and the University of South Africa, the degree of Doctor of Literature and Philosophy is assessed by a thesis examined by a minimum of one internal and two external examiners, with the thesis falling between 60,000 and 90,000 words in length.  The work must make an original contribution to academic knowledge.  A master's degree in a relevant subject with average marks of a minimum of 65% is required for admission.

The UNISA also offers a Doctor of Literature and Philosophy in Health Studies and in Environmental Science.

References

Doctoral degrees
Higher education in South Africa